Sarah or Sara Thompson may refer to:

 Sarah Thompson (actress) (born 1979), American actress
 Sara Thompson (Canadian actress) (born 1995), Canadian actress
 Sarah Thompson, Countess Rumford (1774–1852), first American countess
 Sarah Thompson (Home and Away), fictional character in the Australian soap opera
 Sarah Thompson (athlete) (?–2010), Canadian athlete and powerlifter
 USS Sara Thompson (AO-8), United States naval ship
 Sarah Thompson (physicist)
 Sara Thompson (food scientist)

See also
 Sarah Thomson (disambiguation)